The Stockholm Observatory (050) is an astronomical observatory and institution in Stockholm, Sweden, founded in the 18th century and today part of Stockholm University. In 1931, the new Stockholm Observatory (052), nicknamed "Saltis", was inaugurated on the Karlsbaderberget at Saltsjöbaden, near Stockholm, and operated until 2001.

There are records of daily weather observations from the observatory going back to 1754.

The Stockholm Observatory site at Saltsjöbaden was established with a 40-inch (102 cm) reflecting telescope from Grubb, built in 1931. Also of historical interest is a double telescope by Grubb, the 24/20-inch refractor, with has one 24-inch aperture another 20-inch on the same mount established in 1931.

The old observatory is in modern times a museum (Observatory Museum) and because it is on a hill is known for a good view of city of Stockholm from the dome, and it also has some sculptures and walled garden. The old observatory has many items from across the centuries, including a Repsold telescope, and a marble inlaid meridian line. Many old observatory instruments involved determining the location of stars, the local time, and data was recorded manually. In the late 19th century astrophotography became more common, and the Replsold refractor is known to have been used for making images, which had to be done with chemicals that reacted with light (not with modern electronic devices).

History 

The first observatory was established by the Royal Swedish Academy of Sciences on the initiative of its secretary Per Elvius. Construction, according to designs by the architect Carl Hårleman, begun in 1748 and the building was completed in 1753. It is situated on a hill in a park nowadays named Observatorielunden. The first head of the observatory was Pehr Wilhelm Wargentin. Later heads of the observatory include Hugo Gyldén and Bertil Lindblad. This 18th-century observatory today functions as a museum. 

A newer observatory was built in Saltsjöbaden outside Stockholm and completed in 1931 (the architect this time being Axel Anderberg).  More recent astronomical observations, however, are almost exclusively being done in observatories outside Sweden and closer to the equator.

The research institute was transferred from the academy to the university in 1973 and is since
2001 housed in the AlbaNova University Centre.

The young Hjalmar Branting, later the first social democratic prime minister of Sweden, was employed as a mathematics assistant at the Stockholm Observatory 1879–1880 and 1882–1883.

Honors 

In August 2000, the asteroid 36614 Saltis was discovered at the Stockholm Observatory. The asteroid was named after the nickname of the observatory's location, Saltsjöbaden, by its discoverer Alexis Brandeker in 2003.

4043 Perolof is named after a director of the Stockholm Observatory, Per Olof Lindblad.

Stockholm Observatory at Saltsjöbaden

It was common all over Europe for really old observatories to build in a new site, fortunately the old observatory was not torn down has happened in many cases. Then as the utility of the new sites also waned, the old site was revitalized. This happened similarly in England, where the Greenwich Observatory was moved to a new site in Sussex with new buildings, but then back to the old site again. One issue was the increased crowding in the cities, and also astronomy was growing more focused on data from space in the late 20th century.
In any case the 40-inch (102 cm) reflector was one of the larger telescopes in the whole world for 1931, and is still a large and popular telescopes size even in the 21st century.

Instruments

Some first instruments for the observatory in the 1750s were two refractors and a small quadrant. Throughout the late 1700s the collection was increased, including a refractor from Dollond and various clocks.

The clocks would be set by a device known as a transit instrument. Other activities at that time included trying determine distances in the solar system, observing comets, and observations of the Mira (aka Omicron Ceti). Of note the output of this star was recorded for thirty years by the observatory.

Later instruments by the 19th century include a 7-inch Repsold refractor on an equatorial mount, which was noted to be used at the observatory for parallax observations of bright stars in 1884 edition of Encyclopædia Britannica.

Some of the new instruments at Saltsjöbaden:

40 inch (102 cm) reflecting telescope from Grubb, built in 1931. 
Grubb, the 24/20-inch refractor

See also 
 Architecture of Stockholm
 List of observatory codes
 Aina Elvius
 List of largest optical telescopes in the 20th century
List of largest optical telescopes in the 19th century
List of largest optical telescopes in the 18th century

References

Further reading
From research institution to astronomical museum: a history of the Stockholm Observatory (2008)

External links 

 Observatory Museum (The Old Stockholm Observatory)
 Stockholm Historical Weather Observations

Astronomical observatories in Sweden
Observatory
Stockholm University
Royal Swedish Academy of Sciences
Science museums in Sweden